Nasrin (translit. "nisriyn/ nisrīn"; Nesrin, Nesrine or Nasreen) is a feminine given name in Persian, meaning "wild rose". It is among the most popular names given to girls born in Iran.

The name is also popular in South Asia, especially in Pakistan, India and Bangladesh, as well as being a commonly-used Turkish and Kurdish and North-African (Morocco, Algeria, Tunisia and Libya) given name.

People
Nasreen Mohamedi (1937–1990), Indian artist
Nasreen Jalil (born 1947), Pakistani politician
Nasreen Pervin Huq (1958–2006), Bangladeshi women's rights activist
Nasrin Rahimieh (born 1958), Iranian-American literary critic, editor, and educator
Nesrin Nas (born 1958), Turkish politician of the Motherland Party
Taslima Nasrin (born 1962),  Bangladeshi feminist and former physician
Nasrin Soltankhah (born 1963), Iranian politician
Nasrin Sotoudeh (born 1963), Iranian human rights lawyer
Nasreen Jahan (born 1966), Bangladeshi novelist
Nasreen (born 1978), Bangladeshi film actress
Nesrin Şamdereli (born 1979), Turkish-German screenwriter and film director
Nesrin Cavadzade (born 1982), Turkish actress
Nesreen Tafesh (born 1982), Syrian actress of Palestinian and Algerian descent
Nasreen Qadri (born 1986), Israeli singer
Naisrín Elsafty (born 1989), Irish-Egyptian singer
Nesrine Merouane (born 1995), Algerian volleyball player
Nasrin Husseini, Afghani refugee advocate, veterinary researcher, and food activist
Nesrine Malik, Sudanese-born London-based columnist and author
Nesreen Ghaddar, Lebanese mechanical engineer

See also 
Nasrin, a 2020 documentary about Nasrin Sotoudeh (above)

Notes

Arabic feminine given names
Azerbaijani feminine given names
Bangladeshi feminine given names
Given names derived from plants or flowers
Persian feminine given names
Turkish feminine given names
Pakistani feminine given names